The Coolpix S3 is a digital camera branded by Nikon. Its image sensor is a CCD with 6 million effective pixels (6.4 million total) with a 2.5-inch thin-film transistor liquid crystal display.

See also 
 Nikon Coolpix series
 Nikon Coolpix S1
 Nikon Coolpix S10

References 
 Nikon Coolpix S3: Digital Photography Review
 Steve's Digicams - Nikon Coolpix S3

External links
 http://imaging.nikon.com/lineup/coolpix/style/s3/

S0003